Gortletteragh are a Gaelic Athletic Association club from County Leitrim, Ireland. The club was founded in 1889  They have won Leitrim Senior Football Championship titles five times in 1905, 1970, 1981, 1985 and 1987, and Leitrim Senior Hurling Championship titles eleven times in 1983, 1984, 1985, 1986, 1988, 1989, 1990, 1991, 1996, 1998 and 2011. Former All Star Full Back Seamus Quinn is the club's best known player. The club's Hurling team lost the senior final narrowly in 2010, while its U14 team recently won the Leitrim Féile for the first time.

Honours

 Leitrim Senior Football Championship: (5)
 1905, 1970, 1981, 1985, 1987
 Leitrim Senior Hurling Championship: (11)
 1983, 1984, 1985, 1986, 1988, 1989, 1990, 1991, 1996, 1998, 2011
 Leitrim Intermediate Football Championship: (2)
 2003, 2012
 Leitrim Junior Football Championship: (6)
 1979, 1981, 1982, 1983, 1987, 2000
 Leitrim Senior Football League: 13
 Div. 1:   1984, 1985, 1993, 1995
 Div. 2:   2007, 2012
 Div. 3: 1949. 1958, 1964, 1997, 1999
 Div. 4: 1982, 1983
 Leitrim Minor Football Championship: 8:
 A:    1964, 1979 (as Lough Rynn Gaels), 2012 (as Fenagh/Gortlettteragh)
 B:    1998, 1999, 2000
 C:    2008, 2011
 Leitrim Minor Football League: (2)
 Div 1: 1964
 Div 3: 2012
 Leitrim Under-21 Football Championship: (2)
 A:    1981, 2014

References

External links 
 http://www.gortletteragh.gaa.ie/

Gaelic games clubs in County Leitrim
Gaelic football clubs in County Leitrim
Hurling clubs in County Leitrim